Sultaan is a 2000 Indian Hindi-language action film directed by T L V Prasad and produced by Sangeetha Pictures, starring Mithun Chakraborty, Suvarna Mathew, Jack Gaud, Mukesh Rishi and Dharmendra in a special appearance. The film is a remake of Telugu film Sultan. It was released on 17 March 2000 and failed at the box office.

Plot
Don Kabira helps Ayesha in saving her garage from local goons and hides the fact that he once used to be an honest inspector. However, Ayesha decides to find out the reason for his transformation.

Cast
Mithun Chakraborty	as Abhimanyu - Sultan
Dharmendra as Sultan Raksh Baksh(Special Appearance)
Suvarna Mathew	as Ayesha
Vikas Anand as Balram - Abhimanyu's dad
Birbal as Driver
Jack Gaud as Jay Shankar
Raza Murad	as Veer Badra Rudra Narayan
Yunus Parvez as Shaukat
Shiva Rindanias Kaliya Shankar
Mukesh Rishias Rup Shankar
Tej Sapru as Inspector V. K. Rokade
Shaina as Ayesha
Tiku Talsania as Chaturbuj

Music
The music was composed by Bappi Lahiri and Aadesh Srivastav:
"Gore Badan Pe Yaar Kurti Kassi Kassi" - Ila Arun, Sapna Awasthi
"Hai Soni Kudi Namkeen Badi" - Kavita Krishnamurthy, Bali Brahmabhatt
"Kya Baat Ha" - Kumar Sanu, Alka Yagnik
"Sultaan" - Bappi Lahiri, Jaspinder Narula

Release 
Initially, this film and Zahreela, another Mithun film, were to release on 31 December 1999.

References

External links
 

2000 films
2000s Hindi-language films
Indian action films
2000 action films
Films scored by Bappi Lahiri
Mithun's Dream Factory films
Films shot in Ooty
Hindi remakes of Telugu films
Films directed by T. L. V. Prasad
Hindi-language action films